The Make Believe Pirates is a 1937 Italian "white-telephones" comedy film directed by Marco Elter. It was shown as part of a retrospective on Italian comedy at the 67th Venice International Film Festival.

Cast
 Assia Noris
 Mino Doro (as Mino d'Oro)
 Camillo Pilotto
 Calisto Bertramo
 Olivia Fried
 Giorgio De Rege (as Fratelli de Rege)
 Virgilio Riento
 Rosanna Schettina
 Guido De Rege

References

External links

1937 films
Italian comedy films
1930s Italian-language films
1937 comedy films
Italian black-and-white films
1930s Italian films